Dhrupad is a genre in Hindustani classical music from the Indian subcontinent. It is the oldest known style of major vocal styles associated with Hindustani classical music, Haveli Sangeet of Pushtimarg Sampradaya and also related to the South Indian Carnatic tradition. It is a term of Sanskrit origin, derived from dhruva (ध्रुव, immovable, permanent) and pada (पद, verse). The roots of Dhrupad are ancient. It is discussed in the Hindu Sanskrit text Natyashastra (~200 BCE – 200 CE), and other ancient and medieval Sanskrit texts, such as chapter 33 of Book 10 in the Bhagavata Purana (~800–1000 CE), where the theories of music and devotional songs for Krishna are summarized.

The term denotes both the verse form of the poetry and the style in which it is sung. It is spiritual, heroic, thoughtful, virtuous, embedding moral wisdom or solemn form of song-music combination. Thematic matter ranges from the religious and spiritual (mostly in praise of Hindu deities) to royal panegyrics, musicology and romance.

A Dhrupad has at least four stanza, called Sthayi (or Asthayi), Antara, Sanchari and Abhoga. The Sthayi part is a melody that uses the middle octave's first tetrachord and the lower octave notes. The Antara part uses the middle octave's second tetrachord and the higher octave notes. The Sanchari part is the development phase, which holistically builds using parts of Sthayi and Antara already played, and it uses melodic material built with all the three octave notes. Sometimes a fifth stanza called Bhoga is included. Though usually related to philosophical or Bhakti (emotional devotion to a god or goddess) themes, some Dhrupads were composed to praise kings.

The tradition of Dhrupad is recorded back to saints of Braj (Mathura) namely Swami Haridas, Surdas, Govind Swami, Asht Sakha of Haveli Sangeet and followed by Tansen and Baiju Bawara. When Dhrupad composition are based on Bhagwan Shri Vishnu or his incarnations thereof, is called Vishnupad.

History
Dhrupad probably it's name from dhruvapada mentioned in Natyashastra to denote structured songs. It is one of the core forms of classical music found all over the Indian subcontinent. The word comes from Dhruva which means immovable and permanent. It is spiritual, heroic, thoughtful, virtuous, embedding moral wisdom or solemn form of song-music combination.  The Yugala Shataka of Shri Shribhatta in the Nimbarka Sampradaya, written in 1294 CE, contains Dhrupad lyrics.

The earliest source that mentions a musical genre called Dhrupad is Ain-i-Akbari of Abu Fazl (1593). Later works attribute much of the material to musicians in the court of Man Singh Tomar (fl. 1486-1516) of Gwalior. In these accounts from the Mughal court Dhrupad is portrayed as a musical form which is relatively new; and according to Sanyal, most sources agree that Drupad owes its origin to the court of Man Singh Tomar. Ravi Shankar states that the form appeared in the fifteenth century as a development from the prabandha, which it replaced. The 16th century Bhakti saint and poet-musician Swami Haridas (also in the Nimbarka Sampradaya), was a well known dhrupad singer with songs dedicated to Krishna. It became the court music in the Mughal court with Swami Haridas' pupil Tansen famous, among other things, for his Dhrupad compositions.

Dhrupad is ancient, and another genre of music called Khyal(it have only two parts Sthayi and Antara) evolved from it. Dhrupad is solemn music, uplifting and heroic, pure and spiritual. Khyal adds ornamental notes, shorter, moody and celebratory.

The ancient practice of dancing on Dhrupad has been reintroduced into recent times by Dr. Puru Dadheech.  Dr Dadheech is India's Kathak dancer to bring'Dhrupad' on the formal Kathak stage and this composition in 28 matra.

Nature and practice

Dhrupad as it is known today is performed by a solo singer or a small number of singers in unison to the beat of the pakhavaj rather than the tabla. The vocalist is usually accompanied by two tanpuras, the players sitting close behind, with the percussionist at the right of the vocalist. Traditionally the primary instrument used for dhrupad has been the Rudra Veena, but the surbahar and the sursringar have also long been used for this music. Preferably, any instrument used for Dhrupad should have a deep bass register and long sustain.

Like all Indian classical music, dhrupad is modal and monophonic, with a single melodic line and no chord progression. Each raga has a modal frame - a wealth of micro-tonal ornamentations (gamak) are typical.

The text is preceded by a wholly improvised section, the alap. The alap in dhrupad is sung using a set of syllables, popularly derived from a Vedic mantras and beejakshars, in a recurrent, set pattern: a re ne na, té te re ne na, ri re re ne na, te ne toom ne (this last group is used in the end of a long phrase). These syllables are also used widely in different permutations and combinations. Dhrupad styles have long elaborate alaps, their slow and deliberate melodic development gradually bringing an accelerating rhythmic pulse. In most styles of dhrupad singing it can easily last an hour, broadly subdivided into the alap proper (unmetered), the jor (with steady rhythm) and the jhala (accelerating strumming) or nomtom, when syllables are sung at a very rapid pace. Then the composition is sung to the rhythmic accompaniment: the four lines, in serial order, are termed sthayi, antara, sanchari and aabhog.

Compositions exist in the metres (tala)  (7 beats), sul (10 beats) and chau (12 beats) - a composition set to the 10-beat jhap tala is called a sadra while one set to the 14-beat dhamar is called a dhamar. The latter is seen as a lighter musical form, associated with the Holi spring festival.

Alongside concert performance the practice of singing dhrupad in temples continues, though only a small number of recordings have been made. It bears little resemblance to concert dhrupad: there is very little or no alap; percussion such as bells and finger cymbals, not used in the classical setting, are used here, and the drum used is a smaller, older variant called mrdang, quite similar to the mridangam.

Gharanas and style

There are said to be four broad stylistic variants (vanis or banis) of classical dhrupad – the Gauri (Gauhar), Khandar, Nauhar, and Dagar, tentatively linked to five singing styles known from the 7th Century: Shuddha, Bhinna, Gauri, Vegswara, and Sadharani. 

There are a number of dhrupad Gharanas: "houses", or family styles. 

The best-known gharana is the Dagar family  who sing in the Dagar vani or Dagar Gharana. The Dagar style puts great emphasis on alap and for several generations their singers have performed in pairs (often pairs of brothers). The Dagars are Muslims but sing Hindu texts of Gods and Goddesses. 

The Bishnupur gharana features Manilal Nag, Mita Nag, and Madhuvanti Pal among others. 

From the state of Bihar comes the Darbhanga gharana, Dumraon Gharana (Buxar) and the  Bettiah gharana. The Mallicks of the Darbhanga gharana are linked to the Khandar vani and Gauharvani. Ram Chatur Mallick, Vidur Mallick, Abhay Narayan Mallick, Late Pandit Sanjay Kumar Mallick,Laxman Bhatt Tailang and Siyaram Tiwari were well known personalities of Darbhanga gharana in the 20th century. Dhrupad of the Darbhanga gharana has a strong representation in Vrindaban owing to late Pandit Vidur Mallik, who lived and taught in Vrindaban during the 1980s and 1990s. Great female Dhrupad artists include Asgari Bai, Alaka Lahiri, Ashok Nandy, Madhu Bhatt Tailang, the Pakistani singer Aliya Rasheed, and the Italian singer Amelia Cuni.

Dumraon Gharana -  Dhrupad traditions of Bihar Dumraon gharana is an ancient tradition of dhrupad music nearly 500 years old.  This gharana flourished under the patronage of the kings of Dumraon Raj when it was founded. T'he Drupad style (vanis) of this gharana is Gauhar, Khandar, and Nauharvani. The founder of this gharana was Pt. Manikchand Dubey and Pt. Anup chand Dubey.  Both artists were awarded by Mugal Emperor Shahjahan.  The father of Bharat Ratna Ustad Bismillah Khan who also belonged to the Dumraon Gharana tradition.  He usually played Shahnai in Dhrupad style. Famous living singers of Dumraon Gharana (Buxar) include Pt. Ramjee Mishra, a representative of Dumraon Gharana.Pt. Kamod Mishra- Vrindavan also a representative of Dumraon Gharana.

Many books have been written by this gharana, like Shree Krishn Ramayan, by Pt. Ghana rang Dubey, Surprakash, Bhairav, Prakash, Rashprakash, written by Jay Prakash Dubey and Prakash Kavi.  Abishek Sangit Pallav by Dr. Arvind Kumar.

Much work has been done on this gharana and many items of this Dumraon Gharana are subjects of research.

The Mishras practised Gaurhar, Dagur, Nauhar and Khandar styles. This gharana flourished under the patronage of the kings of Bettiah Raj. Pandit Falguni Mitra is an exponent of this Gharana in the present generation.

Some of the illustrious Dhrupad exponents and virtuosos are Pandit Gokulotsavji Maharaj, Uday Bhawalkar, Ritwik Sanyal, Nirmalya Dey, Pt. Kshitipall Mallick,  Pt. Ram Chatur Mallick and the Gundecha Brothers.

Seminars
In an effort to link tradition and scientific methodologies, the ITC Sangeet Research Academy's Scientific Research Department has been organizing symposia and workshops since 1987. The objective of these workshops/symposia is to create awareness of research in various fields of music. In 2013 the Academy conducted a Dhrupad seminar in association with the National Centre for the Performing Arts (India) (NCPA, Mumbai) where Dr. Puru Dadheech participated as speaker to discuss the origin and predecessors of Dhrupad.  

Prof. Richard Widdess (Head, Department of Music, School of Oriental and African Studies, University of London, UK) and Dr. Dadheech, (Indore, India) discussed the origin of Dhrupad at length. The latter established that Dhrupads are older than the times of Raja Mansingh Tomar.

Documentaries
The filmmaker Mani Kaul while under tutelage of Ustad Zia Mohiuddin Dagar and Ustad Zia Fariduddin Dagar made one of the first documentaries on Dhrupad music in 1982 called “Dhrupad”. This Hindi language full-length documentary features both his gurus along with the young Bahauddin Dagar - the son of Zia Mohiuddin Dagar. The film produced by the Films Division of India was shot in locations associated with history of Dhrupad in – Fatehpur Sikri and Jaipur's Jantar Mantar articulating the theory and the practice of the musical form.

References

Bibliography

 

Indian styles of music
Hindustani music genres
Hindustani music terminology